Álvaro Pachón (born 30 November 1945) is a Colombian former cyclist. He competed at the 1968 Summer Olympics and 1976 Summer Olympics.

Major results

1966 
 4th Overall Vuelta al Táchira
1st Stage 2
1967
 2nd Road race, National Road Championships
 3rd Overall Vuelta a Colombia
1968
 4th Overall Vuelta a Colombia
1st Stage 10
1969
 1st Overall Vuelta al Táchira
 1st Overall Clásico RCN
 2nd Road race, National Road Championships
 6th Overall Vuelta a Colombia
1st Stage 15
1970
 1st  Road race, National Road Championships
 1st Overall Vuelta al Táchira
 5th Overall Vuelta a Colombia
1971
 1st Overall Vuelta a Colombia
1st Stages 1, 3, 5 & 13
1972
 3rd Road race, National Road Championships
1973
 3rd Overall Vuelta a Colombia
1st Stage 11
1974
 1st Overall Vuelta al Táchira
 1st Stages 9 & 12 Vuelta a Colombia
 4th Overall Giro Ciclistico d'Italia
1st Stage 8
1976
 1st Stages 3 & 8 Vuelta a Colombia
1979
 8th Overall Vuelta a Colombia
1980
 10th Overall Vuelta a Colombia

References

External links
 

1945 births
Living people
Colombian male cyclists
Olympic cyclists of Colombia
Cyclists at the 1968 Summer Olympics
Cyclists at the 1976 Summer Olympics
Sportspeople from Bogotá
20th-century Colombian people